Neocollyris assamensis is a species of ground beetle in the genus Neocollyris in the family Carabidae. It was described by Naviaux in 1994.

References

Assamensis, Neocollyris
Beetles described in 1994